Timothy Danladi (born 15 October 1996) is a Nigerian international footballer who plays for Enyimba, as a defender.

Career
Born in Katsina, Danladi has played club football for Taraba, Katsina United and Enyimba.

He made his international debut for Nigeria in 2018.

References

1996 births
Living people
Nigerian footballers
Nigeria international footballers
Taraba F.C. players
Katsina United F.C. players
Enyimba F.C. players
Association football defenders
Nigeria A' international footballers
2018 African Nations Championship players